Nicola Biondi (October 7, 1866 – 1929) was an Italian painter.

Born in Capua, he studied at the Istituto di Belle Arti in Naples. His thematic was eclectic and included genre and portraits in peasant dress. He exhibited at the Promotrice of Naples his nocturnal painting Una partita. In Rome he exhibited Ultima prova. Among his pupils was Scarano Marcello. Biondi died in Naples in 1929.

References

1866 births
1929 deaths
People from Capua
19th-century Italian painters
Italian male painters
20th-century Italian painters
Painters from Naples
19th-century Italian male artists
20th-century Italian male artists